Cargo Dragon may refer to:
 SpaceX Dragon, the original Dragon spacecraft
 Cargo variant of SpaceX Dragon 2

See also 
 Dragon (disambiguation)
 Dragon II (disambiguation)